The International Food Festival may refer to:

The International Food Festival (London, Ontario); held in London, Ontario, Canada.
International Food Festival (Korea Development Institute); held in Seoul, South Korea